Le Grammont is a mountain in the Chablais Alps, near Le Bouveret in Valais. At 2,172 metres above sea level, it is one of the highest peaks overlooking Lake Geneva. Various trails lead to the summit, mostly from the southern side.

On the way to the summit, there is a mountain lake, the Lac de Taney.

The Tauredunum event of AD 563 is thought to have occurred on the slopes of Le Grammont, named for a Roman-era fortress situated close to the point where the Rhône flows into Lake Geneva.

During the Second World War, there is a recorded incident of a Lancaster of the Royal Air Force getting shot down by the Swiss anti-aircraft gunners and crashing into the mountain. The pilot of the aircraft was Horace Badge and all of the crew were lost.

See also 
 List of mountains of Switzerland
 Swiss Alps

Notes and references

External links 

 Le Grammont on Hikr

Mountains of the Alps
Mountains of Valais
Mountains of Switzerland
Two-thousanders of Switzerland